Laodica (minor planet designation: 507 Laodica) is a minor planet orbiting the Sun.

References

External links 
 Lightcurve plot of 507 Laodica, Palmer Divide Observatory, B. D. Warner (2001)
 Lightcurves 507 Laodica, tripod.com
 Asteroid Lightcurve Database (LCDB), query form (info )
 Dictionary of Minor Planet Names, Google books
 Asteroids and comets rotation curves, CdR – Observatoire de Genève, Raoul Behrend
 Discovery Circumstances: Numbered Minor Planets (1)-(5000) – Minor Planet Center
 
 

Laodica asteroids
Background asteroids
Laodica
Laodica
X-type asteroids (SMASS)
19030219